Antoni Sobik (17 January 1905 – 23 June 1994) was a Polish fencer. He competed at the 1936 and 1948 Summer Olympics.

References

1905 births
1994 deaths
Polish male fencers
Olympic fencers of Poland
Fencers at the 1936 Summer Olympics
Fencers at the 1948 Summer Olympics
People from Rawa County
Sportspeople from Łódź Voivodeship
People from Piotrków Governorate
20th-century Polish people